King Features Syndicate, Inc. is an American content distribution and animation studio, consumer product licensing and print syndication company owned by Hearst Communications that distributes about 150 comic strips, newspaper columns, editorial cartoons, puzzles, and games to nearly 5,000 newspapers worldwide. King Features Syndicate also produces intellectual properties, develops new content and franchises, like The Cuphead Show!, which it produced with Netflix, and licenses its classic characters and properties. King Features Syndicate is a unit of Hearst Holdings, Inc., which combines the Hearst Corporation's cable-network partnerships, television programming and distribution activities, and syndication companies. King Features' affiliate syndicates are North America Syndicate and Cowles Syndicate.

History 

William Randolph Hearst's newspapers began syndicating material in 1895 after receiving requests from other newspapers. The first official Hearst syndicate was called Newspaper Feature Service, Inc., established in 1913. In 1914, Hearst and his manager Moses Koenigsberg consolidated all of Hearst's syndication enterprises under one banner (although Newspaper Feature Service was still in operation into at least the 1930s). Koenigsberg gave it his own name (the German word König means king) when he launched King Features Syndicate on November 16, 1915.
 
Production escalated in 1916 with King Features buying and selling its own staff-created feature material. A trade publication — Circulation — was published by King Features between 1916 and 1933. In January 1929, the world-famous Popeye the sailor man character was introduced in King Features' Thimble Theater comic strip. 

King Features had a series of hits during the 1930s with the launch of Blondie (1930–present), Flash Gordon (1934–2003), Mandrake the Magician (1934–2013), and The Phantom (1936–present). In March 1936, a fictional, magical animal called Eugene the Jeep was added to Popeye, and trademarked. 

King Features remained a "powerhouse" syndicate throughout the 1950s and the 1960s. In 1965 it launched a children's comic and coloring page.

In 1986, King Features acquired the Register and Tribune Syndicate for $4.3 million. Later that year, Hearst bought News America Syndicate (formerly Publishers-Hall). By this point, with both King Features and News America (renamed North America Syndicate), Hearst led all syndication services with 316 features.

In 2007, King Features donated its collection of comic-strip proof sheets (two sets of over 60 years' accumulation) to the Billy Ireland Cartoon Library & Museum and the Michigan State University Comic Art Collection while retaining the collection in electronic form for reference purposes.

In November 2015, King Features released a book, entitled “King of the Comics: One Hundred Years of King Features Syndicate” to commemorate its 100th anniversary. The book features a compilation of strips and the histories behind King Features strips.

As of 2016, with 62 strips being syndicated, Hearst was considered the second-largest comics service, second only to Uclick (now known as Andrews McMeel Syndication).

In December 2017, King Features appointed CJ Kettler as president of the company. Kettler previously was CEO of Sunbow Entertainment and the executive producer of the Netflix TV series Carmen Sandiego.

William Randolph Hearst's involvement 

In 1941, King Features manager Moses Koenigsberg wrote an autobiographical history of the company entitled King News. William Randolph Hearst paid close attention to the comic strips, even in the last years of his life, as is evident in these 1945–46 correspondence excerpts, originally in Editor & Publisher (December 1946), about the creation of Dick's Adventures in Dreamland — a strip that made its debut on Sunday, January 12, 1947; written by former Daily News reporter Max Trell and illustrated by Neil O'Keefe (who also drew for King Features a strip based on Edgar Wallace's Inspector Wade of Scotland Yard):

 Hearst to King Features president J. D. Gortatowsky (December 28, 1945): "I have had numerous suggestions for incorporating some American history of a vivid kind in the adventure strips of the comic section. The difficulty is to find something that will sufficiently interest the kids… Perhaps a title — "Trained by Fate" — would be general enough. Take Paul Revere and show him as a boy making as much of his boyhood life as possible, and culminate, of course, with his ride. Take Betsy Ross for a heroine, or Barbara Fritchie… for the girls."

 King Features editor Ward Greene to Hearst: "There is another way to do it, which is somewhat fantastic, but which I submit for your consideration. That is to devise a new comic… a dream idea revolving around a boy we might call Dick. Dick, or his equivalent, would go in his dream with Mad Anthony Wayne at the storming of Stony Point or with Decatur at Tripoli… [This would] provide a constant character… who would become known to the kids."

 Hearst to Greene: "The dream idea for the American history series is splendid. It gives continuity and personal interest, and you can make more than one page of each series… You are right about the importance of the artist."

 Greene to Hearst (enclosing samples): "We employed the dream device, building the comic around a small boy."

 Hearst: "I think the drawing of Dick and His Dad is amazingly good. It is perfectly splendid. I am afraid, however, that similar beginning and conclusion of each page might give a deadly sameness to the series… Perhaps we could get the dream idea over by having only the conclusion on each page. I mean, do not show the boy going to sleep every time and then show him waking up, but let the waking up come as a termination to each page… Can you develop anything out of the idea of having Dick the son of the keeper of the Liberty Statue in New York Harbor? I do not suggest this, as it would probably add further complications, but it might give a spiritual tie to all the dreams. The main thing, however, is to get more realism."

 Greene: "We do not have to show the dream at the beginning and end of every page… If we simply call the comic something like Dreamer Dick, we would have more freedom… Some device other than the dream might be used… A simple method would be to have him curl up with a history book."

 Hearst: "If we find [the first series] is not a success, of course we can brief it, but if it is a success it should be a long series."

 Greene: "I am sending you two sample pages of Dick's Adventures in Dreamland which start a series about Christopher Columbus."

 Hearst: "In January, I am told, we are going to 16 pages regularly on Puck, the Comic Weekly. That would be a good time to introduce the Columbus series, don't you think so?"

The last strips Hearst personally selected for syndication were Elliot Caplin & John Cullen Murphy's Big Ben Bolt and Mort Walker's Beetle Bailey; Hearst died in 1951.

Editors 
In the 1940s, Ward Greene (1893–1956) was King Features' editor, having worked his way up through the ranks. He was a reporter and war correspondent for the Atlanta Journal for four years (1913–17), moving to the New-York Tribune in 1917 and then returning to the Atlanta Journal as correspondent in France and Germany (1918–19). He joined King Features in 1920, became a writer and editor of the magazine section in 1925, advancing to executive editor and general manager.

Vice president Bradley Kelly (1894–1969) was a comics editor during the 1940s.

Sylvan Byck (1904–1982) was head editor of the syndicate's comics features for several decades, from the 1950s until his retirement in 1978. A King Features employee for more than 40 years and comics editor for 33 years, Byck was 78 when he died July 8, 1982. Comic-strip artist John Celardo (1918–2012) began as a King comics editor in 1973.

In 1973, Tom Pritchard (1928–1992) joined King Features, and became executive editor in 1990, overseeing daily editorial operations and the development of political cartoons, syndicated columns, and editorial services for King Features and North America Syndicate. Born in Bronxville, New York, Pritchard arrived at King Features after work as a reporter at The Record-Journal (Meriden, Connecticut), as feature writer with The Hartford Times, as editor-publisher of Connecticut's weekly Wethersfield Post, and as executive editor of The Manchester Journal Inquirer in Connecticut. He died of a heart attack in December 1992 at his home in Norwalk.

In 1978, cartoonist Bill Yates (1921–2001) took over as King Features' comics editor. He had previously edited Dell Publishing's cartoon magazines (1000 Jokes, Ballyhoo, For Laughing Out Loud) and Dell's paperback cartoon collections. Yates resigned from King Features at the end of 1988 to spend full-time on his cartooning, and he died March 26, 2001.

In 1988, Yates was replaced by Jay Kennedy — author of The Official Underground & Newave Comix Price Guide (Norton Boatner, 1982). Kennedy was King Features' lead editor until March 15, 2007, when he drowned in a riptide while vacationing in Costa Rica.

Brendan Burford, who attended the School of Visual Arts, was employed for a year as an editorial assistant at DC Comics before joining King Features as an editorial assistant in January 2000. Working closely with Jay Kennedy over a seven-year span, he was promoted to associate editor and then, after Kennedy's death, to the position of comics editor on April 23, 2007.

In November 2018, Tea Fougner was promoted to editorial director for comics after working as an editor at King Features for nine years. She is the first female-assigned and first genderqueer person to oversee comics editorial at King Features.

Comics editors 
 1940s: Bradley Kelly
 1946–1956: Ward Greene
 1956–1978: Sylvan Byck
 1978–1988: Bill Yates
 1988–2007: Jay Kennedy
 2007–2017: Brendan Burford
 2018–Present: Tea Fougner

Strip submissions 
When asked to speak in public, Byck made a point of telling audiences that King Features received more than 1,000 strip proposals annually, but chose only one each year. However, in Syd Hoff's The Art of Cartooning (Stravon, 1973), Byck offered some tips regarding strip submissions, including the creation of central characters with warmth and charm and the avoidance of "themes that are too confining," as he explained: 
 Although characterization is the most important element of a comic, the cartoonist also must cope with the problem of choosing a theme for his new strip. What will it be about? Actually, it is possible to do a successful comic strip about almost anything or anybody if the writing and drawing are exactly right for the chosen subject. In general, though, it is best to stay away from themes that are too confining. If you achieve your goal of syndication, you want your strip to last a long time. You don't want to run out of ideas after a few weeks or months. In humor strips, it is better to build around a character than around a job. For example, it is possible to do some very funny comic strip gags about a taxi driver. But a strip that is limited to taxi driver gags is bound to wear thin pretty fast. I'd rather see a strip about a warmly funny man who just happens to earn his living as a cabbie and whose job is only a minor facet of his potential for inspiring gags. Narrative strips can be and often are based on the central character's job. For example, the basis of a private eye strip is the work he does. But even here the strip will only be as successful as the characterization in it. The big question is: what kind of a man is this particular private eye?

Content distribution 
King Features Syndicate's content distribution division distributes more than 150 different comics, games, puzzles, and columns, in digital and print formats, to nearly 5,000 daily, Sunday, weekly and online newspapers and other publishers. Comic properties include Beetle Bailey, Blondie, Dennis the Menace, The Family Circus, Curtis, Rhymes with Orange, Arctic Circle, Macanudo, and Zits. The division additionally offers turnkey digital solutions for smaller publishers and community papers, including pagination and colorization services through its sister company, RBMA.

In March 2018, to mark International Women’s Day, many King Features cartoonists included messages about female empowerment and other topics that resonated with them.

In April 2020, Bianca Xunise became the first black woman to join the team of female creatore behind King Features strip Six Chix. Six Chix was first syndicated by King Features in May 2019, after King Features saw strip creator Maritsa Patrinos’ work online.

In June 2020, King Features started syndicating webcomic Rae the Doe. In the same month, cartoonists from King Features, along with artists from Kirkman’s, Andrews McMeel Syndication and National Cartoonists Society, hid symbols in their Sunday strips as a tribute to essential workers during the COVID-19 Pandemic.

In September 2020, King Features relaunched comic strip Mark Trail, originally launched in 1946, with cartoonist Jules Rivera, author of comic strip Love, Joolz, at the helm.

Animation, comic books, and licensing 
Many King characters were adapted to animation, both theatrical and television cartoons. Strips from King Features were often reprinted by comic book publishers. In 1967, King Features made an effort to publish comic books of its own by establishing King Comics. This short-lived comic-book line showcased King's best-known characters in seven titles:

 Beetle Bailey
 Blondie
 Flash Gordon
 Jungle Jim
 Mandrake the Magician
 The Phantom
 Popeye

The comics imprint existed for a year-and-a-half, with titles cover-dated from August 1966 to December 1967. When it ended, the books were picked up and continued by Gold Key Comics, Harvey Comics, and Charlton Comics.

In 1967, Al Brodax, then the president of King Features, pitched The Beatles manager Brian Epstein on turning their hit song "Yellow Submarine" into an animated movie. The film was widely considered to be the first animated film for adult audiences.

In addition to extensive merchandising and licensing of such iconic characters as Betty Boop, Felix the Cat, and Popeye, King Features has diversified to handle popular animation and TV characters (from "Kukla, Fran and Ollie" and "Howdy Doody" to "Mr. Bill" and "Mr. Magoo"), plus publicly displayed, life-sized art sculptures — "CowParade", "Guitarmania" and "The Trail of the Painted Ponies." King Features also represents David and Goliath, an apparel and accessories line popular with teenagers.

King Features additionally licenses outdoor apparel brand PURENorway, Moomins, Icelandic lifestyle brand Tulipop, ringtone character Crazy Frog and South Korean animated character PUCCA.

As a sales tool, the King Features design team created colorful strip sample folders resembling movie press kits. With rising paper costs and the downsizing of newspapers, the comic-strip arena became increasingly competitive, and by 2002, King salespeople were making in-person pitches to 1,550 daily newspapers across America. King was then receiving more than 6,000 strip submissions each year, yet it accepted only two or three annually. Interviewed in 2002 by Catherine Donaldson-Evans of Fox News, Kennedy commented:
 It is difficult for cartoonists to break into syndication, but contrary to popular understanding, there's more new product being pitched now than 30 years ago. In that regard, there are more opportunities for new cartoonists. There's a finite amount of space to run comic strips—less now than 50 years ago. There are fewer two-paper cities and a lot of papers have shrunk their page size. New strips can succeed. The new cartoonists just have to be that much better.

One of the first original animation projects of King Features Animation is The Cuphead Show! for Netflix, an animated series based on the video game Cuphead by Studio MDHR, known for its use of fully hand-drawn characters and animations in the style of Fleischer Studios. The series had started development since July 2019, and was released on February 18, 2022.

In June 2019, 20th Century Studios and The Walt Disney Company announced the production of an animated film based on the comic strip Flash Gordon. Taiki Waititi was attached to direct and John Davis was announced as the producer.

On May 11, 2020, it was announced that a Popeye movie is in development at King Features Syndicate with Genndy Tartakovsky coming back to the project.

In November 2020, a Hagar the Horrible animated series was announced, written by Eric Zibroski, who wrote and produced the ABC comedy Fresh Off the Boat.

Digital platforms

King's DailyINK online 
Confronted by newspaper cutbacks, King Features has explored new venues, such as placing comic strips on mobile phones. In 2006, it launched DailyINK. On a web page and via email, the DailyINK service made available more than 90 vintage and current comic strips, puzzles, and editorial cartoons. The vintage strips included Bringing Up Father, Buz Sawyer, Flash Gordon, Krazy Kat, The Little King, The Phantom, and Rip Kirby. Jay Kennedy introduced the service early in 2006, commenting:
 Comics are consistently ranked among the most popular sections by newspaper readers. However, because of space, newspapers are not able to offer as vast a selection as many readers would like, and therefore millions of comic lovers are often not exposed to some of the most creative strips. In creating DailyINK, we wanted to ensure that fans had a destination where they could experience our complete lineup of award-winning comic artists and writers. DailyINK really sets the standard for comics online. By offering all of our current favorites updated daily, along with access to our archives of beloved characters as well as political humor and games, we have designed DailyINK.com as a destination fans will want to visit every day for something new.

With 11,000 subscribers by June 2010, more vintage strips were added to DailyINK, including Barney Google, Beetle Bailey, Big Ben Bolt, Brick Bradford, The Heart of Juliet Jones, Jackys Diary, The Katzenjammer Kids, Little Iodine, Mandrake the Magician, Office Hours, Quincy and Radio Patrol. On November 15, 2010, a subscription rate increase to $19.99 was announced, effective December 15, 2010, with applications available on iPhone, iPad, and iPod Touch, plus a "new and improved" DailyINK in 2011. The redesign was by Blenderbox. Added features included original publication dates, a forum, and a blog, mostly promotional, but also with "Ask the Archivist" posts exploring comic-strip history. The "Last 7" feature enables the reader to see a week's worth of comics on one page.

On January 13, 2012, the DailyINK app was voted as the People's Champ in the Funny category in the 2011 Pixel Awards. Established in 2006, the Pixel Awards honor sites and apps displaying excellence in web design and development. Other nominees in the Funny category: JibJab Media Inc, Threaded, Snowball of Duty: White Opps and SoBe Staring Contest.

In 2012, Jackys Diary was dropped from DailyINK, and the Archivist explained: "Unfortunately, we no longer have the rights to publish the strip."

In December 2013, Daily INK was relaunched as a new website called Comics Kingdom.

Comics Kingdom 
In November 2008, King Features introduced Comics Kingdom, a digital platform that newspapers can embed on their sites. Comics Kingdom splits advertising revenue with newspapers carrying the feature; those papers make local sales, while King handles national sales. During the 30-day period in which strips are made available on the newspaper sites, readers could post comments on local community forums.

In January 2019, to commemorate Popeye’s 90th birthday, multiple King Features cartoonists drew their own versions of the comic and published those strips on Comics Kingdom. One comic included the cast of Netflix’s Queer Eye giving Popeye a makeover.

In November 2019, Comics Kingdom launched a YouTube channel featuring classic cartoons from King Features archives. Before launching the channel, in December 2018, King Features launched a series of animated Popeye shorts to its primary YouTube channel, in celebration of the character’s 90th “birthday.” 

In July 2020, comic strip Rhymes with Orange launched a virtual interactive comic with digital drawing company Mental Canvas on Comics Kingdom.

As of January 2022, Comics Kingdom (comicskingdom.com) features comic strips and editorial cartoons which can be accessed and read online. This website also features some interactive puzzles. Comics are updated every day, plus a one-year archive is available to be viewed for free. Older comics can be accessed by being a Comics Kingdom Royal (a paid member, subscribed to their premium subscription service). Subscribers to Comics Kingdom Royal also get to keep a scrapbook of their favorite cartoons, get daily email updates, and access a huge selection of classic vintage comics. Comics Kingdom also features over 30 of comic strips in Spanish.

A la Carte Online Comics 
King's A la Carte Online Comics offers syndication of specific strips aimed at "precisely defined audiences" of specialized websites. These are available in such categories as Animals, Environmental, Military, and Technology.

King Features Weekly Planet 
King Features Weekly Planet was created as an online newspaper of King's columns, comics, and puzzles.

King Features strips and panels 

 Abie the Agent
 The Amazing Spider-Man
 Apartment 3-G
 Arctic Circle 
 Baby Blues
 Barney Google and Snuffy Smith
 Beetle Bailey
 The Better Half
 Betty Boop
 Betty Boop and Felix
 Between Friends
 Big Ben Bolt
 Bizarro
 Bleeker: The Rechargeable Dog
 Blondie
 Boner's Ark
 Brick Bradford
 The Brilliant Mind of Edison Lee
 Bringing Up Father
 Buckles
 Buz Sawyer
 Crankshaft
 Crock
 Curtis
 Deflocked
 Dennis the Menace
 Donald Duck
 Dustin
 Edge City
 Etta Kett
 The Family Circus
 Felix the Cat
 Flapper Filosofy
 Flash Gordon
 Franklin Fibbs
 Funky Winkerbean
 Gil
 Grin and Bear It (ended May 2015)
 Hägar the Horrible
 Happy Hooligan
 Hazel
 Henry
 Hi and Lois
 Hocus-Focus
 Hubert
 Johnny Hazard
 José Carioca
 Judge Parker
 Jungle Jim
 The Katzenjammer Kids
 Kevin and Kell
 King of the Royal Mounted
 Krazy Kat
 Laff-a-Day
 Little Annie Rooney
 Little Audrey
 Little Iodine
 The Little King
 The Lockhorns
 Mallard Fillmore
 Mandrake the Magician
 Mark Trail
 Marvin
 Mary Worth
 Mickey Mouse
 Moose & Molly
 Mother Goose and Grimm
 Mutts
 My Cage
 Norb
 The Norm
 Oh, Brother!
 Ollie and Quentin (reruns began January 9, 2012)
 On the Fastrack
 Ozark Ike
 The Pajama Diaries
 Pete the Tramp
 The Phantom
 Piranha Club
 Popeye
 Prince Valiant
 Radio Patrol
 Red Barry
 Redeye
 Retail
 Rex Morgan, M.D.
 Rhymes with Orange
 Rip Kirby
 Ripley's Believe It or Not!
 Rusty Riley
 Safe Havens
 Sally Forth
 Sam and Silo
 Secret Agent X-9
 Sherman's Lagoon
 Six Chix
 Slylock Fox & Comics for Kids
 Steve Roper and Mike Nomad
 Teena
 They'll Do It Every Time
 Tiger
 Tina's Groove
 Todd the Dinosaur
 Triple Take
 Trudy
 Tundra
 Tumbleweeds
 Zippy the Pinhead
 Zits

Editorial cartoonists 
 Jim Borgman
 Ed Gamble
 Alex Hallatt
 Jeff Koterba
 Jimmy Margulies
 Jim Morin
 Mike Peters
 Mike Shelton
Darrin Bell

Columnists

Commentary 
 Stanley Crouch
 Amy Goodman, "Breaking the Sound Barrier"
 David Hackworth, "Defending America"
 Roger Hernandez
 Rich Lowry
 Marianne Means
 Dan Rather
 Charley Reese
 Maria Elena Salinas

Lifestyle and advice 

 Dana Block and Cindy Elavsky, "Daytime Dial"
 John Bonne et al., "The Wine Chronicle"
 Helen Bottel, "Helen Help Us!"
 Tad Burness, "Auto Album"
 Jack Canfield and Mark Victor Hansen, "Chicken Soup for the Soul"
 Al and Kelly Carell, "Super Handyman"
 Harlan Cohen, "Help Me, Harlan!"
 Vicki Farmer Ellis, "Sew Simple"
 Arthur Frommer, "Arthur Frommer's Travel Column"
 Peggy Gisler and Marge Eberts, "Dear Teacher"
 Heloise, "Hints from Heloise"
 Ken Hoffman, "The Drive-Thru Gourmet"
 Rheta Grimsley Johnson
 Jeanne Jones, "Cook It Light"
 Ralph and Terry Kovel, "Kovels: Antiques and Collecting"
 Tom and Ray Magliozzi from Car Talk, "Click and Clack Talk Cars"
 Tom McMahon, "Kid Tips: Practical Solutions for Everyday Parenting"
 Seventeen, "Dear Seventeen"
 Debbie Travis, "House to Home"
 Barbara Wallraff from Atlantic Monthly, "Word Court"
 Allan Wernick, "Immigration and Citizenship"
 Terry Stickels, "Wit and Wisdom", "Stickelers" column
 Phil Erwin, "The Card Corner"
 Eric Tyson, "Investors' Guide

Affiliated syndicates 
 Torstar Syndication Services (King's distribution partner in Canada)

See also 
 List of newspaper comic strips
 List of comic strip syndicates

References

Sources 
 Koenigsberg, Moses. King News: An Autobiography. New York: F.A. Stokes Company, 1941.

External links 
 
 King Features comic strips
 Comics Kingdom
 King Features Weekly Service
 Brendan Burford interviewed by Tom Spurgeon

American animation studios
Comic strip syndicates
Hearst Communications assets
American companies established in 1914
Mass media companies established in 1914
Mass media companies based in New York City